Friendly Fires are an English indie rock band from St Albans, Hertfordshire, England. They are currently signed to XL Recordings. Their self-titled debut album was released on 1 September 2008, and was announced as one of the shortlisted twelve for the 2009 Mercury Prize on 21 July 2009.

History
Friendly Fires met at St Albans School. At the age of 13, in year eight and nine (the second or third year), the members formed their first band, a post-hardcore outfit called First Day Back, covering songs by Green Day and other rock-like artists, which existed until they began university. During this time, lead singer Ed Macfarlane released his own music (under his own name) through the electronica label Skam, and Precinct Recordings. Upon leaving university, they formed a new band inspired by dance music, "lush shoegaze melodies", and classic pop songwriting. The name Friendly Fires originates from the opening track of the Section 25 LP Always Now. The band considers German techno label Kompakt, Carl Craig and Prince to be their greatest influences.

In late 2007, they became the first unsigned band to appear on Channel 4's Transmission programme. Their single "Paris" achieved "Single of the Week" in The Guardian newspaper, NME magazine, and also on Zane Lowe's BBC Radio 1 show. They have toured extensively, with past performances and festival appearances throughout the UK, Europe, Japan, the US, Canada, Mexico, South America and Australia.

Friendly Fires (2008–11)
In May 2008, their song "On Board" was featured in North American television commercials for Nintendo's Wii Fit. "On Board" is also featured in the trailer for the PlayStation 3 game Gran Turismo 5. "White Diamonds" is featured in one of the episodes in the second season of the American television series Gossip Girl. "Jump in the Pool" is the theme tune to BBC One's final score for the 2009–10 football season, aired on Saturday afternoons. "In the Hospital", and "Lovesick", are featured in the Microsoft Windows, Xbox 360 and PlayStation 3 driving game Colin McRae: Dirt 2. "Lovesick" is played on Soccer AM as the week's football fixtures are announced.

In September 2008, they released their first LP: Friendly Fires, featuring the singles "On Board", "Paris", "Jump in the Pool", and "Skeleton Boy".  The enhanced two-disc version of the album, released on 31 August 2009, included new summer single "Kiss of Life", earlier songs "Relationships" and "Bored of Each Other", other various remixes, and a DVD of their live performance of the band's at London's HMV Forum on 15 May 2009.

The album was certified double gold in the UK; the band was nominated for a Best Breakthrough Award at The South Bank Show Awards and for Best Dancefloor Filler at the NME Awards. They were also second on the bill on the Shockwaves NME Awards Tour in January and February 2009, playing alongside headliner Glasvegas and other up-and-coming bands White Lies and Florence and the Machine. In March 2009, Friendly Fires co-headlined with White Lies on an American equivalent of the tour called NME Presents, with The Soft Pack supporting.

On 21 July 2009, Friendly Fires was nominated for the Mercury Music Prize. They lost to Speech Debelle's Speech Therapy.

On 19 January 2010, the band was nominated for two Brit Awards: Best British Group and British Breakthrough Act.

On 8 March 2010, Friendly Fires released a split 12" single with their New York city friends Holy Ghost!. Friendly Fires covered Holy Ghost!'s "Hold On"; Holy Ghost! covered Friendly Fires' "On Board". The 12" also included instrumental versions of both songs; the download version of the 12" included a dub version of Holy Ghost!'s "On Board".

Friendly Fires have contributed the soundtrack to the Frank Miller-directed TV advertisement for 'Guilty', a women's fragrance by Gucci.  It was a cover of the Depeche Mode song "Strangelove".

On 27 September 2010, Friendly Fires released through Rough Trade Records a special compilation with London club promoters Bugged Out! called Bugged Out Presents Suck My Deck. The 19 songs included on the album were 18 songs, including remixes of songs by Phenomenal Handclap Band and Lindstrom and Christabelle handpicked by the band and "Stay Here", a collaboration between the band and Azari & III.

Pala and hiatus (2011–2014)
In May 2011, their second album Pala was released. The first single was "Live Those Days Tonight", soon followed by "Hawaiian Air". On 16 August of that year, Friendly Fires announced that their trumpet player, Richard Turner, who contributed to their live shows, had died. Turner had suffered a cardiac arrest while swimming on 11 August 2011. At the end of 2011, Friendly Fires played their biggest UK tour to date, starting in Brighton on 10 November, and performing in cities, such as Birmingham, Newcastle, Glasgow and London. An ongoing illness of singer Ed Macfarlane's caused several of these gigs to be rescheduled for December 2011.

Friendly Fires headlined the inaugural ABLE2UK charity concert for disabled awareness on 20 August 2012 at The Roundhouse in London. All proceeds from ticket sales went to ABLE2UK.

When asked in July 2012 by NME about their future direction, Macfarlane stated that the trio have no intentions of writing another pop record like Pala. They have been working with producer Andrew Weatherall and so far, they have come up with some dramatically different results to the band's usual output. Speaking to NME at Poland's Open'er Festival, Macfarlane said, "The music – the way we're writing and the style of it – is very different to anything we've done before; I think we're still learning to write music in a different way. We want to write something long and expansive and drawn-out and, I suppose, a bit more psychedelic." Macfarlane also confirmed that the tracks would definitely be released at some point, most probably under the band's name, "even if it is totally weird, psyched out, eight-minute long jams, we're still gonna call it Friendly Fires."

In 2016, Ed McFarlane and Edd Gibson collaborated with Jon Brooks (The Advisory Circle) under the name The Pattern Forms and released the album Peel Away the Ivy in October 2016.

Inflorescent (2018–present)
On 25 September 2017, the band announced on their Facebook page that they are returning and will be performing at O2 Academy Brixton on 5 April 2018. A 40-second clip of new music was added in a video along with the announcement. On 5 April 2018, the band released "Love Like Waves", their first release since 2012.

On 24 June 2019 the band announced their first album in eight years, Inflorescent. It was released on 16 August 2019 via Polydor Records.

Discography

Studio albums

EPs

Singles

DJ mix albums

Guest appearances

References

External links
Suck My Deck release site with free single download
May 2011 Interview with Edd Gibson and Jack Savidge on There Goes the Fear
Jack Savidge Interview with Voluume & Poule d'Or
Friendly Fires interview on UGO
Friendly Fires Live Review on dailymusicguide.com
Stereokill Live Review: Edinburgh, 10 May 2009
Friendly Fires Essential Mix

English indie rock groups
Dance-punk musical groups
Post-punk revival music groups
Musical groups established in 2006
British musical trios
XL Recordings artists
NME Awards winners
British shoegaze musical groups
Alternative dance musical groups
Musical groups from St Albans
Polydor Records artists